The Diwan ḏ-Nahrawata or Diwan ḏ-Nahrauata is a Mandaean religious text. It is written as an illustrated scroll.

Contents
The scroll contains esoteric schematic diagrams of the cosmos. Well-springs are shown as small circles, mountains as triangles, and rivers as long straight lines. Illustrations in the scroll also depict Hibil Ziwa as the grand mediator and messenger of the Life.

Manuscripts and translations
E. S. Drower obtained a copy of the text and later donated it to the Bodleian Library at Oxford University, where it was catalogued as Manuscript 7 of the Drower Collection (abbreviated DC 7).

The Diwan Nahrawata is a geographical treatise that focuses mainly on esoteric cosmology. Kurt Rudolph published a German translation in 1982, based on a copy held in a private library in Dora, Baghdad that was originally from Ahvaz. It has about 3300 words and was copied by Ram Zihrun, son of Sam Bihram, Kupašia in Shushtar, Iran in 1259 A.H. (1843 A.D.).

References

External links
Diwan Nahrawatha (Mandaic text from the Mandaean Network)
Diwan Nahrawatha (Mandaic text from the Mandaean Network)

Mandaean texts
Esoteric cosmology